Plagiostira gillettei, or Gillette's shieldback, is a species of shield-backed katydid in the family Tettigoniidae. It is found in North America.

Subspecies
These two subspecies belong to the species Plagiostira gillettei:
 Plagiostira gillettei gillettei Caudell, 1907
 Plagiostira gillettei utahensis Tinkham, 1962

References

Tettigoniinae
Articles created by Qbugbot
Insects described in 1907
Orthoptera of North America